Events of 2011 in Spain.

Incumbents 
 Monarch - Juan Carlos I
 Prime Minister - José Luis Rodríguez Zapatero (until 21 December), Mariano Rajoy (starting 21 December)

Events 

 11 May - an earthquake struck Lorca, Murcia.
 15 May - nationwide protests against the economic and political situation.
 22 May - Spanish local elections, 2011.
 20 November - general election, won by the People's Party whose leader is Mariano Rajoy.

Births in 2011 

 27 September - Giorgi Bagration Bagrationi, son of Prince David Bagration of Mukhrani and Princess Anna Bagrationi Gruzinsky

Deaths in 2011 

 7 May - Seve Ballesteros, golfer (born 1957)
 23 May - Xavier Tondó, cyclist (born 1978)

See also
 2011 in Spanish television
 List of Spanish films of 2011

References

 
Spain